Waliszew may refer to the following places in Poland:

 Waliszew, Łódź Voivodeship
 Waliszew, Masovian Voivodeship

See also
 Stary Waliszew, Łódź Voivodeship
 Waliszew Dworski, Łódź Voivodeship